T. Govindan (11 January 1940 - 23 October 2011) was an Indian politician and a former Member of Lok Sabha who represented the Kasaragod constituency of Kerala thrice in the 11th Lok Sabha, 12th Lok Sabha and 13th Lok Sabha respectively. He was a member of the Communist Party of India (Marxist). He died on 23 October 2011.

References

Communist Party of India (Marxist) politicians from Kerala
Malayali politicians
1940 births
2011 deaths
India MPs 1996–1997
India MPs 1998–1999
India MPs 1999–2004
Politicians from Kannur
Lok Sabha members from Kerala
Politics of Kasaragod district